Jamala (born 1983) is a Ukrainian singer and actress.

Jamala may also refer to:

People
Jamala al-Baidhani, Yemeni activist

Places
Jamala, Hama, a village in Hama Governorate, Syria
Jammala, a village in Palestine

See also
Jamal (disambiguation)